Bayar Abubakir  (born 31 May 1990) is an Iraqi footballer who plays as a defender for Duhok in Iraqi Premier League.

International career
On 24 July 2016, Bayar Abubakir made his first international cap with Iraq against Uzbekistan in a friendly match. He scored the only goal for Iraq in a 2-1 defeat.

International goals
Scores and results list Iraq's goal tally first.

References

External links 
 

1990 births
Living people
Association football defenders
Iraqi footballers
Iraq international footballers